The 1971 Washington Star International was a men's tennis tournament and was played on outdoor clay courts. The event was the third edition of the tournament and was part of both the 1971 Grand Prix circuit and 1971 World Championship Tennis circuit. It was held in Washington, D.C., United States from July 12 through July 18, 1971. Ken Rosewall won the singles title and earned a $10,000 first prize.

Finals

Singles

 Ken Rosewall defeated  Marty Riessen 6–2, 7–5, 6–1

Doubles

 Tom Okker /  Marty Riessen defeated  Bob Carmichael /  Ray Ruffels 7–6, 6–2

References

External links
 ATP tournament profile
 ITF tournament edition details

Washington Open (tennis)
Washington Star International
Washington Star International
Washington Star International